Svetla Otsetova (born 23 November 1950) is a Bulgarian rower.

She won a gold medal with Zdravka Yordanova in women's double sculls rowing in the 1976 Montreal Olympics. She also competed at the 1980 Summer Olympics.

She is the third woman in history to serve in the International Olympic Committee. Otsetova was the president of the Bulgarian Rowing Federation until 2012. She is also a recipient of the Order of Stara Planina (1st class).

References

External links
 

1950 births
Living people
Bulgarian female rowers
Olympic rowers of Bulgaria
Rowers at the 1976 Summer Olympics
Rowers at the 1980 Summer Olympics
Olympic gold medalists for Bulgaria
Olympic medalists in rowing
World Rowing Championships medalists for Bulgaria
Medalists at the 1976 Summer Olympics